Adesmus vilhena is a species of beetle in the family Cerambycidae. It was described by Galileo and Martins in 1999. It is known from Brazil and Peru.

References

Adesmus
Beetles described in 1999